

Events calendar

+9